, also written as , is a trans-Neptunian object and centaur from the outer Solar System, approximately 106 kilometers in diameter. It was first observed on 11 July 2007, by American astronomers Megan Schwamb, Michael Brown and David Rabinowitz at Palomar Observatory in California.

The object has a high eccentricity of 0.49. It comes within 17 AU of the Sun (inside the orbit of Uranus) and goes as far as 50 AU at aphelion (near the Kuiper cliff). It passed perihelion in September 1996.

For comparison, among the well-established, highly eccentric orbits formally classified as plutinos, the orbit of  has an eccentricity of 0.318.

It has only been observed twenty-six times over four oppositions.

References

External links 
 List of known Trans-Neptunian Objects, Johnston's Archive
 
 

613766
613766
613766
613766
20070711